Dhada is a 2011 Indian Telugu-language action film directed by Ajay Bhuyan and produced by D. Siva Prasad Reddy. The film features Naga Chaitanya and Kajal Aggarwal. The music composed by Devi Sri Prasad, cinematography by Gnana Shekar V.S of Vedam fame, editing by Dharmendra Kakarala of Prasthanam and LBW - Life Before Wedding fame.

The film was dubbed into Tamil as Tiger Vishva. The film has action scenes inspired from the 2009 film, Sherlock Holmes. In 2013 the movie was dubbed in Hindi under the same title and produced by Goldmines Telefilms. Dhada collected (gross) in its total run. The film received negative reviews and was a box office failure.

Plot
Viswa's (Naga Chaitanya) family members are introduced, namely his older brother Rajiv (Sriram) and his sister-in-law Preethi (Sameksha). Viswa meets Rhea (Kajal Aggarwal), who is the only daughter of a wealthy business tycoon (Mukesh Rishi) who is concerned about money and growth, but not about affection and love. While Viswa is trying to get Rhea's attention, he accidentally gets into a quarrel with a gang that does business with human trafficking. He fights and frees some girls who were kidnapped. The gang leader RD (Rahul Dev) tries to find Viswa and kill him. Rhea's father sets up a proposal with another business tycoon's son Amit (Eijaz Khan). Rhea is not interested. The gang's owner soon finds out that Rajiv works for him and tries to chase him down, but Viswa beats everybody up. He soon realizes that he has to save Rhea from Amit. Amit tries to kill her by locking her in a car and throwing the car into an ocean, but Viswa saves her. The film ends with Viswa bringing Rhea out of the ocean in a blanket and them talking.

Cast

 Naga Chaitanya as Viswa
 Kajal Aggarwal as Rhea
 Sriram as Rajiv, Viswa's brother
 Samiksha as Preethi, Viswa's sister-in-law
 Brahmanandam
 Eijaz Khan as Amit
 Kelly Dorji as Kelly
 Rahul Dev as RD
 Mukesh Rishi as Rhea's father
 Junaid Sheikh as Michael 
 Uttej
 Venu Madhav
 Tanikella Bharani as Preethi's father (cameo)
 Satya Krishnan as Rhea's mother (cameo)
 Aruna Shields as an item number "Bhoome Gundranga"

Production
Reports emerged in December 2009 that director Ajay Bhuyan would direct a film starring Naga Chaitanya in the lead role. The film soon began production works with Kajal Aggarwal being signed on in a leading role, with the producers announcing a release date of July 2010. The producers approached Arjun and Kamalinee Mukherjee to appear as the brother and the sister-in-law of Naga Chaitanya, although talks were unsuccessful. Subsequently, Srikanth and Anita Hassanandani were selected for the roles, but Anita opted out before her schedule began and was then replaced by Samiksha.

The film began shooting in May 2010 after delays. The film was completed in four schedules, with the climax being shot in Bangkok, Thailand.

Distribution

Satellite rights

Box office
Dhada was released with 90 digital prints in 70 theatres (AP). The film was released in 20 theatres in Hyderabad itself
Dhada collected (Share) and (gross) in its lifetime.

Soundtrack

The soundtrack was composed by Devi Sri Prasad. The music was released on 25 July 2011 at Shilpa Kala Vedika, Hyderabad. The soundtrack consists of seven tracks. It was released by Aditya Music. Akkineni Nageswara Rao and Dr D Ramanaidu attended the function as chief guests.

Accolades

Filmfare Awards South
 Nominated - Best Playback Singer - Female - Neha Bhasin – "Hello Hello"

SIIMA Awards
 Nominated - Best Debutant Director - Ajay Bhuyan

References

External links
 

2011 action comedy films
Indian action comedy films
2011 films
2010s Telugu-language films
2000s masala films
Films shot in Bangkok
Films shot at Ramoji Film City
Films about human trafficking in India
Films about prostitution in India
Films shot in Switzerland
2011 comedy films